Crenicichla menezesi is a species of cichlid native to South America. It is found in the Rivers of Maranão, Brazil.

The fish is named  in honor of Naércio Aquino Menezes (b. 1937) of the Museu de Zoologia da Universidade de São Paulo, as thanks for Ploeg’s stay at the museum in October 1987.

References

Ploeg, A., 1991. Revision of the South American cichlid genus Crenicichla Heckel, 1840, with description of fifteen new species and consideration on species groups, phylogeny and biogeography (Pisces, Perciformes, Cichlidae). Univ. Amsterdam, Netherlands,153 p. Ph.D. dissertation. 

menezesi
Freshwater fish of Brazil
Taxa named by Alex Ploeg
Fish described in 1991